The 1899 United States Senate election in Massachusetts was held during January 1899. Republican incumbent Henry Cabot Lodge won election to a second term easily.

At the time, Massachusetts elected United States senators by a majority vote of the combined houses of the Massachusetts General Court.

Background
Although Democrats made gains in the 1898 state elections, the General Court remained overwhelmingly Republican, assuring Lodge's re-election.

Nominating caucuses
The Republican legislative caucus unanimously re-nominated Senator Lodge by acclamation on January 10, although his chief critic within the party, State Senator Herbert Parsons of Greenfield, did not attend.

The Democrats nominated Alexander B. Bruce, the former mayor of Lawrence and candidate for Governor in 1898.

Results
The vote in the House was 159 for Lodge, 65 for Bruce, and 2 for Social Democrat Winfield P. Porter.

The vote in the Senate was 31 for Lodge and 7 for Bruce. Senator Herbert Parsons refused to vote for Lodge.

References

1899
Massachusetts
United States Senate